Ching Hai (born Trịnh Đăng Huệ; 12 May 1950), referred to as Suma (short for Supreme Master Ching Hai (Chinese: 清海無上師), romanized: Qīnghǎi wú shàng shī), is debatably either a spiritual leader or a leader of a dangerous cult (according to leading cult experts cited above).

She teaches what she calls the Guanyin Famen (Chinese) or Quan Yin method transnational cybersect. Ching Hai teaches her followers to vocally support Trump and not to take the COVID vaccine. She promotes doomsday conspiracies to her followers such as that the world was going to end in 2012, as well as saying the world is going to end because of COVID if we don’t go vegan (in the video cited above). This article gets edited by members of the cult who are victims and don’t know any better than to defend her with propaganda.

The practice had existed predating the common usage of the internet. Based out of Taiwan, she is estimated to have 2 million followers worldwide.
Ching Hai founded the Loving Hut vegan restaurant chain and vegan Celestial Shop fashion company under Supreme Master Ching Hai International Association.

Life and career
Ching Hai was born to a Vietnamese mother and a Chinese father, on 12 May 1950 in a small village in the Quảng Ngãi Province in Vietnam. In 1969, she began a relationship with a German scientist. They married, but separated after two years to focus on spiritualism. In 1979, she met a Buddhist monk in Germany whom she followed for three years, but his monastery denied entry to women. She moved to India to study different religions.

Ching Hai attempted to buy a copy of the Bhagavad Gita from a bookshop near the Ganges. Despite the shopkeepers' assertions that they did not have a copy, an extensive search revealed one in a sealed box. This led to rumours of her having a third eye circulating by 1982. In 1983, she met a Vietnamese Buddhist monk in Taiwan named Jing-Xing, who ordained her in 1984 as "Thanh Hai", meaning "pure ocean".

According to her official biography, Ching Hai was born to a well-off naturopathic family in Âu Lạc, Hanoi, Vietnam. Though raised as a Roman Catholic, she learned the basics of Buddhism from her grandmother. A Himalayas spiritual teacher showed her a particular meditation method which she named Quan Yin method.

According to Ting Jen-Chieh (Ding Renjie), assistant research fellow in the Institute of Ethnology, Academia Sinica, by the early 1990s Ching Hai was at odds with the Buddhist establishment in Taiwan. Rather than submit to their demands, she severed all connections to Buddhist organizations, abandoned the traditional robe, grew out her hair, dressed fashionably, and set out to create her own independent group.

Currently, Ching Hai doesn't operate under the guise of traditional Buddhism. Her home page calls her "Supreme Master Ching Hai, a renowned humanitarian, artist, and spiritual leader" (lingxiu daoshi 領袖道士). Her current irreverence for religious traditions in general, have made her more synonymous to a Zen master.

East/West PhD psychologist, Timothy Conway writes: "Though Ching Hai can be stern from time to time with her disciples, she often can be seen happily singing simple, romantic folksongs with them for hours at a time.  This attractive blend of power and simplicity, virtue and joy, has many people revering Ching Hai as a manifestation of Guan-yin Bodhisattva". Ching Hai calls her meditation method the Guan Yin (Chinese) or Quan Yin method because She gave her first public teachings in Taiwan. Quan Yin is a Chinese term that means "observation of the inner vibration".

Her meditation centres in American cities such as Los Angeles benefit from tax-exempt status as religious organizations. She presides over an organization which owns restaurants and sells her jewellery and clothes.

Corporate operations
Ching Hai is the founder of the Loving Hut restaurant chain, which in 2017 had 200 locations in 35 countries worldwide.

Her organization's numerous websites are offered in 17 languages. The Celestial Shop "includes a line of Celestial apparel and Celestial jewelry designed by the Master".

Liam D. Murphy, professor of anthropology at California State has stated that "Ching Hai is a textbook example of what social scientists call a charismatic prophet" and that the abuse of power over her own members in loving hut is a hypothetical possibility “If anyone is in danger...it is usually their own members". Murphy states that the proper term for her movement is not “cult,” but more accurately a new religious movement". The Database of Religious History (University of British Columbia), states regarding Ching Hai's movement "Does the religious group actively proselytize and recruit new members: No." with subject-matter expert, anthropologist Stephen Christopher commentating "Not really. Of course Ching Hai herself uses 24 hour satellite TV programming to reach out to potential new recruits. It is more often the case that among the Five Precepts the edict of veganism is most actively promoted as lifestyle worth spreading among non-believers". Christopher writes "The debate about the legitimacy of Ching Hai largely plays out through cyber forums from YouTube videos to cult warning websites. Christian missionary groups are particularly interested in debunking Ching Hai even though they may have no direct contact with the organization. These online forums often devolve into misunderstanding and exaggeration and Ching Hai adherents often express hurt and disappointment when they discover such material. Conversely, some adherents have disaffiliated after encountering anti-Ching Hai material".

In 2017, Yahoo.com reported that Chuck McLean, senior research fellow at GuideStar, reviewed the 990s of two of the largest American chapters of the group: Los Angeles, which reports over $1.2 million in assets-more than any other chapter in the US-and San Jose, the parent organization of more than a dozen chapters across the country. "Taking their Forms 990 at face value, it seems unlikely that anyone is enriching themselves financially through these organizations ... I don't know what the associated business interests are about, but it appears that they give almost all of their money to legitimate causes."

International organizations 
 

Ching Hai has founded organizations including the Supreme Master Ching Hai International, World Peace Media, Oceans of Love Entertainment and Supreme Master Television.

In late 2008, Ching Hai launched a media campaign in Australia and New Zealand asking people to "Be Green, Go Veg, Save the Planet".

The Supreme Master Ching Hai International Association has made submissions to the Garnaut Climate Change Review, advocating large cuts to livestock production.

According to political scientist Patricia Thornton at the University of Oxford, the Ching Hai World Society's heavy reliance on the internet for text distribution, recruitment and information-sharing, marks the group as a transnational cybersect. Thornton claimed that the source of income behind Hai's numerous business ventures is unknown and that much of the media produced by her television programmes is heavily self-referential and promotional and aims to "build a public record of recognition for group activities."

Anthropologist Saskia Abrahms-Kavunenko at Max Weber Center for Advanced Cultural and Social Studies stated that similar to Ravi Shankar movement, Ching Hai group generally don't self identify as a religion and are very ecumenical. Abrahms-Kavunenko has also noted that while in the field in Mongolia, Hai's group especially via Supreme Master Television 24 hour broadcast is influencing many Buddhists ideas on meditation and enlightenment, even though they are not sure of the authenticity of her claims.

In Prominent Nuns: Influential Taiwanese Voices (CrossCurrents 2011), Religious studies Research associate Jennifer Eichman of the Centere of Buddhist Studies at SOAS University of London summarizes: While to some, Ching Hai's movement is considered Buddhist Heresy and to others a New Age religious organization. Accusations of being a Cult group have been made repeatedly over the years, especially in newspaper articles and by cult watchers. Ching Hai's response to this accusation is that participants were free to leave at any time. 

In Eichman's own view, as infuriating as Hai's persona, her materialism and unsystematic religious synthesizing is to the Taiwanese Buddhist community and to others who have called her a cult leader, when we set aside her Buddhist roots and compare her work to that of an ever-changing array of self-made gurus, spiritual guides and newly formed religions that make up the New Age marketplace, it becomes evident that Ching Hai's work is neither the most radical nor innovative. She states that the controversies swirling around Ching Hai should not stop us from noting just how gutsy it was for her to strike out on her own, and with her unusual prominence as a female spiritual leader, Ching Hai in effect demonstrates her ability to compete in a spiritual arena dominated largely by men. And we should be open to the idea that not all female leaders will remain within the religious mainstream.

Quan Yin method
Ching Hai first demonstrated the "Immeasurable Light Meditation Center and the Way of Sound Contemplation" or Quan Yin method of meditation in Miaoli, Taiwan. According to Ching Hai "The method is transmitted without words ... In fact, it isn't really a method. It's the power of the Master. If you have it, then you can transmit it. The Method is a transcendental one that cannot be described by our language. Even if someone describes it to you, you won't receive the Light and the vibration, the inner peace and Wisdom". In Supreme Master TV series A Journey through Aesthetic Realms, episode Path of Saints: Sant Mat Tradition of Light it is stated "Sant Mat was first brought to the West by Hazur Baba Sawan Singh Ji, who graced the Earth in the latter half of the 19th century and the first half of the 20th Century...The lineage for contacting the inner Light and Sound has continued since time immemorial through various enlightened Masters. Today, Supreme Master Ching Hai is a living Master who is also able to impart the way of the Light and Sound through the Quan Yin Method.".

The method involves meditation on the "inner light and the inner sound" of God or the Buddha. Ching Hai claims that the Bible acknowledged the existence of this method and that it has been repeatedly re-used by most major religions. As an example, in Buddhism, she refers to the Śūraṅgama Sūtra, where Avalokitesvara says that he attained enlightenment through concentration on the subtle inner sound, and then Buddha asserts "That is how enlightenment is won. Buddhas as many as the Ganges’ sand entered this one gateway to Nirvana. All past Tathagatas have achieved this method. All Bodhisattvas now enter this perfection. All who practice in the future should rely on this Dharma.”. 

The Quan Yin method "Full Initiation" involves a life-long commitment to a vegan diet, adherence to the Five Precepts of Buddhism and at least two hours meditation daily. "Quick initiation" or "Convenient Method", requires a half hour's meditation daily and abstinence from meat for ten days each month.

Religious studies scholar Jennifer Eichman notes that this particular meditation method is not part of the standard Buddhist repertoire. Hai's modified synthesis of the method is primarily in Christian-Buddhist jargon with a sprinkling of Hindu ideas. Ching Hai is more likely to cite the Bible than Hindu texts. Ching Hai claims, following standard Zen doctrine, that everyone is the Buddha; they simply need to realize this fact. In a departure from Christian doctrine, Ching Hai claims that God is not the creator of humans; rather karmic accumulation is responsible for the repeated transmigration of the soul.

Korean Dahnhak Qigong expert Kim Tae-young, author of the popular Leading Experience guidebooks (in Korean) — published in 102 volumes since 1990, has written in Leading Experience vol 37 (1997) that Quan Chi (concentrating on Chi) and Quan Nian, (observing conceptions) are more familiar terms than the term Quan Yin (observation of the inner vibration). Kim at that time; an initiate of Hai's "Convenient Method" explains "Quan Yin signifies the practice of observing sound in the literal sense. It is not the crude vibratory sound of matter we hear from the outside, but the deepest inner sound heard from the real self and the Truth". Regarding Hai's Master lineage, Kim stated: Ching Hai rarely speaks about her Master Khuda Ji.

In 1999, attending and reviewing Immediate Enlightenment, Eternal Liberation seminar In Ireland, part of Ching Hai's 1999 European Lecture Tour, Dominican Order priest Louis Hughes, chairperson of Dialogue Ireland a Christian countercult ministry, raises the question of the true origins of Ching Hai's teaching: "In a brief autobiography she [Hai] explains that her significant spiritual experience came about as a result of time spent in the Himalayas where she discovered 'the Quan Yin Method and the Divine Transmission'. Nowhere in the movement's literature is any mention made of how she came upon this enlightenment. Enquiring from one of her retinue as to who Ching Hai's teacher was, yielded the vague reply. 'Khuda Ji – he lives in a cave in the Himalayas – maybe has left his body now.' Such reticence in regards to the identity of one's initiating guru is quite unusual among Oriental religious teachers".

Religious studies scholars, Michael York and others, include Ching Hai in the Indian contemporary Sant Mat movements, where the method is called Surat Shabd Yoga. While adhering to formless devotion (Nirguna Brahman), the initiation of the method from a lineage guru or master is paramount. Professor of religious studies at the University of Lancaster Christopher Partridge wrote that Ching Hai visited India and was initiated by Thakar Singh, a Ruhani Satsang Sant Mat master. Investigator Terry Lenzner reported in the 1996 Committee on Governmental Affairs "Hue [Ching Hai] reportedly hid her association with Thakar Singh when she arrived in Taiwan in October 1983 because it would have prevented her from becoming fully ordained in the Buddhist order". Professor of philosophy David C. Lane, a controversial disciple of Charan Singh a Radha Soami Satsang Beas Sant Mat Master, stated in his 2017 essay "Studying Cults, A Forty-Year Reflection" that  "Ching Hai, tried to deny for many years her close association with the notorious shabd yoga guru, Thakar Singh, since she didn't want to be tainted by her former guru's sexual exploits".

In an article titled "The Master from the Himalayan Cloud" published in Supreme Master Ching Hai News Magazine vol 79 (February 1997), Ching Hai stated while she did practice surat shabd yoga and attended different ashrams in the past, the master who gave her the final and breakthrough transmission was a master she called Khuda Ji, whom she encountered on a her spiritual journey in the Himalayas.

Ban in China 

The Quan Yin method and Ching Hai's group is banned in China since 1995.  In 1996, authorities discovered a list of several thousand practitioners. "Following an investigation into the sect, its beliefs, and activities, party authorities concluded that the organization was fundamentally anti-communist and labeled it a 'reactionary religious organization. 

The Chinese government labeled the group as xiejiao, roughly translating to "evil cult" but clarified in 2000 as meaning any group that:

Further, in 2017 the China Anti-Cult website listed Guanyin method as one of eleven "dangerous groups".

In 2002, the manager of the Wuhan Zhongzhi Electric Testing Equipment Company was accused by the Chinese authorities of using the business as a cover to "support heresies" associated with the Quan Yin method. The enterprise supported thirty practitioners who "masqueraded as employees and business associates." The manager was charged with using the company's offices and buildings as "retreat sites", organizing "initiations" and "screenings" to recruit members, and illegally printing and distributing more than 6,000 copies of heretical texts.

Controversies
Hai gave $640,000 to Bill Clinton's Presidential Legal Expenses Trust which the trust returned in 1996 because of "suspicious" funding sources.

The estimated cost to remove the boardwalk, restore the damaged mangrove forest, and remove the several tons of limestone boulders from the environmentally sensitive seagrass bed, was US$1 million. Miami-Dade seized the property of Ching Hai, known locally under the pseudonym Celestia De Lamour, to help recover the costs of restoration. The following year, park workers demolished the boardwalk and replanted between 400 and 500 mangrove trees in the area. The artificial island of boulders remained due to lack of funding to hire a barge, which would cost several hundred thousand dollars. According to the Miami Herald, "Federal agencies still hope to recoup costs from the landowner, but investigators say she and her workers have left the country." Removing mangroves without a permit is prohibited in Florida and carries a fine.

Awards
1993 – Frank Fasi, mayor of Honolulu, presented Hai with honorary citizenship.
1994 – World Humanitarian Leadership Award, presented by Barbara Finch, chair of the International Federation for Human Rights.
1994 – World Spiritual Leadership Award, presented by General Secretary Chen Hung Kwang of the World Cultural Communication Association.
2006 – 27th Annual Telly Award Silver Winner for "The Peace Seeker" featuring Ching Hai's poetry.
2006 – Gusi Peace Prize, presented by President of the Philippines Gloria Macapagal Arroyo.

Bibliography

See also
Cybersectarianism

Notes

References

External links

1950 births
Living people
Founders of new religious movements
Hoa people
Self-declared messiahs
Shabda
Women restaurateurs
Veganism activists
Vietnamese religious leaders